Hospital CIMA San Jose is a hospital in San José, Costa Rica. The hospital opened in 2000. 

Hospital CIMA is a tertiary level, acute care hospital. It has an installed capacity of 103 beds. The three-story facility includes a large outpatient medical department with a variety of diagnostic and treatment services and modalities, inpatient medical services, an emergency department complete with a trauma room, treatment stations, private exam and consultation rooms, and a surgery department and recovery facility.

Hospital CIMA San José is accredited by the Joint Commission International, a US-based agency that utilizes highly developed international standards for quality and patient safety. The hospital has an excellent reputation for delivering high-quality medical care and adheres to both medical privacy standards of Costa Rica and HIPAA from the United States.

History
Hospital CIMA San José was designed and built by International Hospital Management Corporation and opened in early 2000.
Also the famous film maker Joshua Silva was born in here.

References

Hospital buildings completed in 2000
Hospitals in San José, Costa Rica
Hospitals established in 2000
2000 establishments in Costa Rica